This is a list of schools in Yuen Long District, Hong Kong.

Secondary schools

 Government
 Chiu Lut Sau Memorial Secondary School
 New Territories Heung Yee Kuk Yuen Long District Secondary School
 Tin Shui Wai Government Secondary School
 Yuen Long Public Secondary School

 Aided
 Bethel High School
 Buddhist Mau Fung Memorial College (佛教茂峰法師紀念中學)
 Caritas YL Chan Chun Ha Secondary School (明愛元朗陳震夏中學)
 CCC Fong Yun Wah Secondary School (中華基督教會方潤華中學)
 CCC Kei Long College (中華基督教會基朗中學)
 CCC Kei Yuen College (中華基督教會基元中學)
 CUHKFAA Thomas Cheung Secondary School (香港中文大學校友會聯會張煊昌中學)
 Cumberland Presbyterian Church Yao Dao Secondary School (金巴崙長老會耀道中學)
 The Evangelical Lutheran Church of Hong Kong Yuen Long Lutheran Secondary School (基督教香港信義會元朗信義中學)
 Gertrude Simon Lutheran College (路德會西門英才中學)
 The Hong Kong Management Association K S Lo College (香港管理專業協會羅桂祥中學)
 Ho Dao College (sponsored by Sik Sik Yuen) (可道中學（嗇色園主辦）)
 Jockey Club Man Kwan Eduyoung College (賽馬會萬鈞毅智書院)
 Ju Ching Chu Secondary School (Yuen Long) (裘錦秋中學（元朗）)
 Poh Tang Pui King Memorial College (博愛醫院鄧佩瓊紀念中學)
 Pui Shing Catholic Secondary School (天主教培聖中學)
 Queen Elizabeth School Old Students' Association Secondary School (伊利沙伯中學舊生會中學)
 Queen Elizabeth School Old Students' Association Tong Kwok Wah Secondary School (伊利沙伯中學舊生會湯國華中學)
 Shung Tak Catholic English College (天主教崇德英文書院)
 SKH Bishop Baker Secondary School (聖公會白約翰會督中學)
 SPHRC Kung Yik She Secondary School (十八鄉鄉事委員會公益社中學)
 STFA Yung Yau College (順德聯誼總會翁祐中學)
 Tin Shui Wai Methodist College (天水圍循道衞理中學)
 TWGH Cy Ma Memorial College (東華三院馬振玉紀念中學)
 TWGH Kwok Yat Wai College (東華三院郭一葦中學)
 TWGH Lo Kon Ting Memorial College (東華三院盧幹庭紀念中學)
 The Yuen Yuen Institute MFBM Nei Ming Chan Lui Chung Tak Memorial College (圓玄學院妙法寺內明陳呂重德紀念中學)
 YLPMSAA Tang Siu Tong Secondary School (元朗公立中學校友會鄧兆棠中學)
 Yuen Long Catholic Secondary School (元朗天主教中學)
 Yuen Long Merchants Association Secondary School (元朗商會中學)

 Direct Subsidy Scheme
 Chinese YMCA Secondary School (中華基督教青年會中學)
 ELCHK Lutheran Academy (基督教香港信義會宏信書院)
 Heung To Middle School (Tin Shui Wai) (天水圍香島中學)
 HKFYG Lee Shau Kee College (香港青年協會李兆基書院)
 Man Kwan Pak Kau College (萬鈞伯裘書院)

 Private
 Beacon College (遵理學校)
 Gertrude Simon Lutheran Evening College (路德會西門英才夜校)
 Rudolf Steiner Education Foundation Hong Kong Maria College

Primary schools

 Government
 South Yuen Long Government Primary School (南元朗官立小學)
 Tin Shui Wai Government Primary School (天水圍官立小學)
 Yuen Long Government Primary School (元朗官立小學)

 Aided
 AD&FD of POHL Leung Sing Tak School (博愛醫院歷屆總理聯誼會梁省德學校)
 Buddhist Chan Wing Kan Memorial School (佛教陳榮根紀念學校)
 Buddhist Wing Yan School (佛教榮茵學校)
 C & M Alliance Chui Chak Lam Memorial School (基督教宣道會徐澤林紀念小學)
 CCC Chun Kwong Primary School (中華基督教會元朗真光小學)
 CCC Fong Yun Wah Primary School (中華基督教會方潤華小學)
 Chinese YMCA Primary School (中華基督教青年會小學)
 Chiu Yang Por Yen Primary School (潮陽百欣小學)
 Chiu Yang Primary School of Hong Kong (香港潮陽小學)
 Christian Alliance S Y Yeh Memorial Primary School (宣道會葉紹蔭紀念小學)
 Chung Sing School (鐘聲學校)
 Cumberland Presbyterian Church Yao Dao Primary School (金巴崙長老會耀道小學)
 Hong Kong and Macau Lutheran Church Wong Chan Sook Ying Memorial School (港澳信義會黃陳淑英紀念學校)
 HKFYG Lee Shau Kee Primary School (香港青年協會李兆基小學)
 Ho Ming Primary School SPSD by Sik Sik Yuen (嗇色園主辦可銘學校)
 Hong Kong Student Aid Society Primary School (香港學生輔助會小學)
 Kam Tin Mung Yeung Public School (錦田公立蒙養學校)
 Kwong Ming School (光明學校)
 Kwong Ming Ying Loi School (光明英來學校)
 Lions Clubs International Ho Tak Sum Primary School (獅子會何德心小學)
 Lok Sin Tong Leung Kai Kui Primary School (樂善堂梁銶琚學校)
 LST Leung Kau Kui Primary School (Branch) (樂善堂梁銶琚學校（分校）)
 Pat Heung Central Primary School (八鄉中心小學)
 Queen Elizabeth School Old Students' Association Branch Primary School (伊利沙伯中學舊生會小學分校)
 Queen Elizabeth School Old Students' Association Primary School (伊利沙伯中學舊生會小學)
 SKH Ling Oi Primary School (聖公會靈愛小學)
 SKH St Joseph's Primary School (聖公會聖約瑟小學)
 SKH Tin Shui Wai Ling Oi Primary School (聖公會天水圍靈愛小學)
 Shap Pat Heung Rural Committee Kung Yik She Primary School (十八鄉鄉事委員會公益社小學)
 STFA Wu Mien Tuen Primary School (順德聯誼總會伍冕端小學)
 Tin Shui Wai Catholic Primary School (天水圍天主教小學)
 Tin Shui Wai Methodist Primary School (天水圍循道衞理小學)
 Tun Yu School (惇裕學校)
 Tung Tak School (通德學校)
 TWGH Leo Tung-hai Lee Primary School (東華三院李東海小學)
 TWGH Yiu Dak Chi Memorial Primary School (Yuen Long) (東華三院姚達之紀念小學（元朗）)
 Xianggang Putonghua Yanxishe Primary School of Science and Creativity (香港普通話研習社科技創意小學)
 Yuen Long Long Ping Estate Tung Koon Primary School (元朗朗屏邨東莞學校)
 Yuen Long Public Middle School Alumni Association Tang Ying Yip Primary School (元朗公立中學校友會鄧英業小學)
 Yuen Long Public Middle School Alumni Association Primary School (元朗公立中學校友會小學)
 Yuen Long Long Ping Estate Wai Chow School (元朗朗屏邨惠州學校)
 Yuen Long Merchants Association Primary School (元朗商會小學)
 Yuen Long Po Kok Primary School (元朗寶覺小學)

 Direct Subsidy Scheme
 ELCHK Lutheran Academy (基督教香港信義會宏信書院)
 W F Joseph Lee Primary School (和富慈善基金李宗德小學)

 Private
 ELCHK Lutheran School (基督教香港信義會啟信學校)
 Gigamind English Primary School (激活英文小學)
 Zenith Primary School & Kindergarten (英藝小學暨幼稚園)

Special schools

 Aided
 Buddhist TCS Yeung Yat Lam Memorial School (道慈佛社楊日霖紀念學校)
 Caritas Lok Kan School (明愛樂勤學校)
 Hong Chi Morningjoy School, Yuen Long (匡智元朗晨樂學校)
 Hong Chi Morninglight School, Yuen Long (匡智元朗晨曦學校)
 PLK Law's Foundation School (保良局羅氏信託學校)

References

Lists of schools in Hong Kong
Yuen Long District